The Hawu language is the language of the Savu people of Savu Island in Indonesia and of Raijua Island off the western tip of Savu. Hawu has been referred to by a variety of names such as Havu, Savu, Sabu,  Sawu, and is known to outsiders as Savu or Sabu (thus Havunese, Savunese, Sawunese). Hawu belongs to the Malayo-Polynesian branch of the Austronesian language family, and is most closely related to Dhao (spoken on Rote) and the languages of Sumba. Dhao was once considered a dialect of Hawu, but the two languages are not mutually intelligible.

Dialects
The Seba ( in Hawu) dialect is dominant, covering most of Savu Island and the main city of Seba. Timu ( in Hawu) is spoken in the east, Mesara ( in Hawu) in the west, and Liae on the southern tip of the island. Raijua is spoken on the island of the same name ( 'Jua Island'), just off-shore to the west of Savu.

Linguistic Structure
The following description is based on Walker (1982) and Grimes (2006).

Phonology 
The Hawu consonant inventory is smaller than that of Dhao:

Consonants of the  column are apical, those of the  column laminal. A wye sound  (written ) is found at the beginning of some words in Seba dialect where Timu and Raijua dialects have .

Phonetic long vowels and diphthongs are vowel sequences. The penultimate syllable/vowel is stressed. (Every vowel constitutes a syllable.) A stressed schwa lengthens the following consonant:

 'with',  'what?',  'eat, food',  'senile',  'wind'.

Syllables are consonant-vowel (CV) or vowel-only (V).

Implosives

Hawu shares implosive (or perhaps pre-glottalized) consonants with several other languages of the Lesser Sundas, including Bimanese, Kambera, Komodo, Li'o, Ngad'a, and Riung. While these languages are somewhat geographically close, they are not necessarily closely-related. Many belong to different high-order Austronesian subgroups. As a result, implosives seem to be an areal feature—perhaps motivated by language contact and the reduction of homorganic nasal clusters in some languages—as opposed to an innovated feature.

Hawu, however, is the only language in the region with four implosives in its phonological inventory. All four implosives can occur both word-initially and intervocalically.

Historical vowel metathesis

The phonological history of Hawu is characterized by an unusual, but fully regular vowel metathesis, which affects the Proto-Malayo-Polynesian (PMP) vowel sequences *uCa/*uCə and *iCa/*iCə. The former changes into əCu, the latter into əCi, as illustrated in the following table.

Grammar
Clauses are usually verb-initial. However, the presence of the ergative preposition allows for a freer word order. Among monovalent verbs, S may occur before or after the verb. According to speakers, there is no difference in meaning between the two following constructions.

In the absence of the ergative preposition, bivalent constructions have strict AVO word order.

When the ergative preposition is present, word order becomes quite free. Verbs that end in  have no alternation. The following examples (from the Seba dialect) present a few of the word order options available, and also show the alternation of the verb  'to eat' to  when  is present.

Within noun phrases, modifiers usually follow the noun, though there are some possibly lexicalized exceptions, such as  'many people' (compare Dhao  'people many').

Apart from this, and unlike in Dhao, all pronominal reference uses independent pronouns. These are:

The demonstratives are complex and poorly understood. They may be contrasted by number (see Walker 1982), but it is not confirmed by Grimes. 

Sample clauses (Grimes 2006). (Compare the Dhao equivalents at Dhao language#Grammar.)

Language resources 
The Alan T. Walker Collection contains a number of resources produced through Hawu language documentation, including audio recordings, handwritten field notes, and narrative texts. An accompanying Finding Aid and Inventory was created for the collection in order to more easily navigate its contents in the PARADISEC archive.

The "Results of Linguistic Fieldwork and Documentation Training Program in East Nusa Tenggara" collection, which is also archived with PARADISEC, contains audio recordings of Hawu conversations, narratives, elicitation, genealogies, and wordlists. Several are also accompanied by video files.

Notes

References
 
 

Savu languages
Languages of Indonesia